Ernest Warburton (10 June 1937 in Irlam – 7 August 2001 in London) was a noted musicologist who specialized in the music of Johann Christian Bach. His efforts were published from 1984 to 1999 in the 48 volumes of The Collected Works of Johann Christian Bach.

Warburton was also an executive with BBC Radio, serving as Head of Music Programmes (1977–1982) and Editor of Music for BBC Radio 3 (1982–1986) before transferring to the BBC World Service. During this period, he revived many obscure operas, such as Wagner's Die Feen and Rienzi and Puccini's Le Villi.

As general editor of The Collected Works of Johann Christian Bach, Warburton not only edited a share of the music, but wrote out the scores printed in the edition in his own calligraphy.

After obtaining his BA at Oxford in 1959, Warburton was unable to stay there to complete his DPhil, due to lack of money. Ernest Warburton's lack of money led to him working as a music teacher at Queen Mary's Grammar School for Boys, Basingstoke, Hants, in 1960. Warburton continued working at Queen Mary's Grammar School until 1964, when he completed his DPhil . Ernest Warburton's shortage of money explains why a distinguished musicologist was briefly a teacher at a relatively obscure provincial school. Despite Warburton being a teacher at an obscure provincial school, his behavior was described as humorous, entertaining, and compassionate, as said in one of his obituaries: “Although feared by some for his acerbic tongue - unleashed only on those who fell below the high standards he set himself and required from others - he was a companionable and humorous man, long-suffering and often highly entertaining.” Warburton was wont, for example, to severely admonish his school choir immediately before a concert, likening them to a “bunch of wet cod on a slab”. Warburton's greatest achievement at Queen Mary's Grammar School was the single-handed direction of Bach's St Matthew Passion at the town Parish Church. This production involved his own school choir, the choir of the Girls’ High School, and some professional soloists. To be known later as “the white tornado” on account of his striking platinum blond hair (he had albinism), the boys’ nickname for him at the school was simply “Omo” (after the contemporary washing powder which was “whiter than white”).

From 1964 to 1967 he was Director of Music at Bishop's Stortford College before moving to the BBC.

References

Sources

1937 births
2001 deaths
People from Irlam
20th-century British musicologists